Assailants ambushed a security convoy transporting prisoners in Hashimiyah area, Babil governorate, Iraq. At least 75 people were killed and five people were injured in the attack; the victims included prisoners, police officers, and assailants. No group claimed responsibility for the incident; however, sources attributed the attack to ISIL.

References

2014 murders in Iraq
21st-century mass murder in Iraq
Mass murder in 2014
Terrorist incidents in Iraq in 2014